India participated in the 1990 Asian Winter Games held in Sapporo, Hokkaidō, Japan,  from March 9 to March 14. India failed to win any medal in the Games.

1990
Nations at the 1990 Asian Winter Games